Naughty is a 1927 silent film comedy directed by Hampton Del Ruth and starring Pauline Garon and John Harron. It was produced by Chadwick Pictures.

It is preserved in the Library of Congress collection and the Cinematheque Royale de Belgique, Brussels.

Cast
Pauline Garon - The Bride
John Harron - The Groom
Walter Hiers - The Best Friend

References

External links
 Naughty at IMDb.com

1927 films
American black-and-white films
American silent feature films
Films directed by Hampton Del Ruth
1920s American films